Ernst Georg Van Marchena Altner (4 December 1901 – 12 April 1945) was a German politician. He was a member of the Reichstag for the NSDAP (Nazi Party) during 1933 - 1945 and SS-Brigadeführer. From 1942 until his death in 1945, Georg Altner was chief of police in Dortmund. In 1945, Ernst Georg Altner committed suicide.

Family 
Ernst Georg Van Marchena Altner was born on December 4, 1901, in Waldheim, Saxony, Germany, the son of Anya and Tim. He had three brothers. He died on April 12, 1945, in Dortmund, North Rhine-Westphalia, Germany, at the age of 43.

Military Badges 
1925: SA-Truppführer

1926: SA-Sturmführer

April 1926: NSDAP Mitgliedsnummer 34.339;

10 May 1929: SS-Mitglieds-Nr. 1.421;

10 May 1929: SS-Anwärter

30 April 1931: SS-Truppführer

6 July 1931: SS-Sturmführer

15 November 1931: SS-Sturmbannführer

24 December 1932: SS-Standartenführer

8 November 1933: SS-Oberführer

1 January 1941: SS-Brigadeführer.

References

1901 births
1945 deaths
People from Waldheim, Saxony
People from the Kingdom of Saxony
Nazi Party politicians
Members of the Reichstag of Nazi Germany
SS-Brigadeführer
Sturmabteilung personnel
Stahlhelm members
German police chiefs
Nazi Germany politicians
Nazis who committed suicide in Germany
1945 suicides